Blood type is a classification of blood based on the presence and absence of antibodies.

Blood type or Blood Type may also refer to:

 Blood Type (album) (Gruppa krovi), an album by the Soviet rock band Kino
 "Blood Type", a song from the album Against All Odds (Tragedy Khadafi album)
 Blood Type: Blue (also called Blue Christmas), a 1978 Japanese science fiction film

See also
 Blood type (non-human)
 Human blood group systems
 Blood typing — test to identify blood types